Elections to Warrington Borough Council were held on 5 May 2011. Twenty seats out of the total of fifty-seven were up for election. The Labour Party gained control of the council which had been run by a Liberal-Democrat/Conservative coalition.

Results

Ward results

References

www.warrington.gov.uk/elections

2011 English local elections
2011
2010s in Cheshire